Salvia alatipetiolata is a perennial plant that is native to Sichuan province in China, growing on grassy hillsides at  elevation. The upper leaf surface is mostly smooth, while the underside has many gray hairs.

Inflorescences are of loose raceme-panicles, with a  yellowish corolla held in a purple calyx.

References

alatipetiolata
Flora of China